Lillgrund Wind Farm is located about 10 km off the coast of southern Sweden, just south of the Öresund Bridge, where average wind speeds are . With 48 wind turbines (Siemens SWT-2.3-93) and a capacity of 110 megawatts (MW), Lillgrund is Sweden's largest offshore wind farm.
It was designed to meet the domestic electricity demand of more than 60,000 homes. The farm's turbines have a rotor diameter of 93 metres and a total height of 115 metres.

A 2016 study found no significant effect on marine life.

The music video for "Peroxide" by British-Swedish singer Ecco2K was filmed at Lillgrund Wind Farm in January, 2020.

See also

List of offshore wind farms in Sweden
List of offshore wind farms in the Baltic Sea
List of large wind farms
List of wind farms in Sweden
List of offshore wind farms

References

External links

Images from Lillgrund Wind Farm
LORC Knowledge - Datasheet for Lillgrund Offshore Wind Farm

Wind farms in Sweden
Offshore wind farms in the Baltic Sea
Vattenfall wind farms
Buildings and structures in the Øresund Region
Energy infrastructure completed in 2008
2008 establishments in Sweden